Gonactiniidae is a family of anthozoans in the order Actinaria.

Genera
Gonactinia Sars, 1851
Protanthea Carlgren, 1891

References

 
Metridioidea
Cnidarian families